Uno Veering (born 27 October 1949 in Harju County) is an Estonian lawyer.

In 1992, he was Minister of State Affairs.

1995–1999, he was State Secretary of Estonia.

References

Living people
1949 births
20th-century Estonian lawyers
21st-century Estonian lawyers